"Breathe" is the debut single of French dance music group Télépopmusik. It features guest vocals by Scottish singer Angela McCluskey and appears on the group's 2001 album, Genetic World. Released as a single in 2002, "Breathe" reached  42 on the UK Singles Chart in March of that year. The single was released later that year in the US and appeared on the Billboard Hot Dance Club Play chart (No. 9) and Hot 100 chart (No. 78) in February 2003.

Reception

Critical
The song was reviewed favorably by Chris Long at the BBC, who described McCluskey's vocals as "breathless" and said the single was "a deliciously silky track that lolls by a holiday pool and enjoys the sunshine." AllMusic felt that the song was one of the highlights of "Genetic World," the song's parent album.

Commercial
The song was the group's commercial breakthrough, charting in both the UK and the US. "Breathe" reached number 42 on the UK Singles Chart dated 2 March 2002. The song peaked at number 78 on the Billboard Hot 100, spending two months on the tally. On the Hot Dance Club Play chart, the song was a top-10 hit, peaking at number 9. The song also reached number 31 on the Rhythmic Songs chart.

Accolades
"Breathe" was nominated for a Grammy Award in the category Best Dance Recording at the ceremony held in February 2004, eventually losing out to "Come into My World" by Kylie Minogue.

Music video
The music video for "Breathe" was shot in Hollywood, Los Angeles in 2001. It was directed by Jordan Scott (daughter of movie director Ridley Scott), who was 24 at the time. The video features several people gathered by a pool. A man looks bemused before laying down. 
A Monarch butterfly flies over him. As he grabs it in his hand, a child watches him nearby, angering the child. The man falls asleep as the child walks over. The child appears to have a mechanical “compartment” on her back.
His dreams consist of moving shots within an underground train and of wheat fields (similar to those on the Genetic World cover). 
The child looks to an older woman for approval, before pouring “glitter” into a glass of water. She wakes the man and hands him the glass of water. The man drinks while she smiles maliciously, before the man faints.
The video is mostly in slow-motion. The video was nominated for "Electronic Music Video of the Year" at the 2003 Music Video Production Association Awards.

Use in media
"Breathe" was featured in an advertising campaign by the automobile company Mitsubishi in 2003 to promote its Outlander model, and in the UK by Peugeot in 2002 to promote the 307. "Breathe" was also featured in the advertising campaign by Visa Europe in their "Love Every Day" campaign.
Carte Noire 2011. In 2013, indie pop band New Navy covered the song; their version was featured on the compilation album Majestic Casual: Chapter 1.

Track listings

Charts

Release history

References

External links
 Watch the official music video on YouTube
 Breathe · Télépopmusik · Angela McCluskey  hear the official music Provided to YouTube by Universal Music Group
 hear the 2square remix on YouTube

2001 songs
2002 debut singles
Capitol Records singles
Chrysalis Records singles
Télépopmusik songs